HMS C26 was one of 38 C-class submarines built for the Royal Navy in the first decade of the 20th century.

Design and description
The C-class boats of the 1907–08 and subsequent Naval Programmes were modified to improve their speed, both above and below the surface. They displaced  on the surface and  submerged. The C-class submarines had a crew of two officers and fourteen ratings.

For surface running, the boats were powered by a single 12-cylinder  Vickers petrol engine that drove one propeller shaft. When submerged the propeller was driven by a  electric motor. They could reach  on the surface and  underwater.

The boats were armed with two 18-inch (45 cm) torpedo tubes in the bow. They could carry a pair of reload torpedoes, but generally did not as they would have to remove an equal weight of fuel in compensation.

Construction and career
C26 was built by Vickers, Barrow. She was laid down on 14 February 1908 and was commissioned on 28 May 1909. C26 was part of the Baltic operations from 1915 to 1918. HMS C26 was salvaged in August 1953 for breaking up in Finland.

Notes

References

External links
 MaritimeQuest HMS C26 pages

 

British C-class submarines
Royal Navy ship names
Ships built in Barrow-in-Furness
World War I shipwrecks in the Baltic Sea
Maritime incidents in 1918
1909 ships
Shipwrecks of Finland
Scuttled vessels of the United Kingdom